The English women's cricket team toured India in January 2002. They played India in 5 One Day Internationals and 1 Test match. India won the ODI series 5–0, whilst the Test match was drawn.

Squads

Tour Matches

50-over match: Women's Cricket Association of India v England

2-day match: Women's Cricket Association of India v England

50-over match: Women's Cricket Association of India v England

50-over match: Women's Cricket Association of India v England

WODI Series

1st ODI

2nd ODI

3rd ODI

4th ODI

5th ODI

Only Test

References

External links
England Women tour of India 2001/02 from Cricinfo

International cricket competitions in 2002
India
Women's international cricket tours of India
2002 in women's cricket